Uprising 2011- Indians Against Corruption, published in January 2013, is a pictorial diary/chronicle of the civil-society supported anti-corruption movement that took place in India between 2010 and 2012. The period compilation has been jointly brought together by Kiran Bedi and Pavan Choudary as a dedication to all the Indians who participated in anti-corruption uprising led by Anna Hazare.

Summary
Uprising 2011 is a compilation of selected news clippings, cartoons, interesting quotes and published articles of the anti-corruption movement that took place in India between 2010 – 2012, also referred to as India's Arab Spring or its second war of independence (against corruption). The book gives a thumb-nail view of the historical awakening of the Indian society, to take the readers through the struggle chronologically as it was being reported.

See also
Corruption in India

References

2013 non-fiction books
Books about politics of India
Anti-corruption activism in India
Indian non-fiction books
21st-century Indian books